Eucyclotoma bicarinata is a species of sea snail, a marine gastropod mollusk in the family Raphitomidae.

Description

The white, turreted shell is elongate. It contains six whorls, clathrated throughout by longitudinal and transverse elevated striae. The body whorl is ornamented with two and the spire with one keel. The keels are very prominent, crenulated on their edge.  The whorls descend obliquely from the keels to the suture. The middle of the body whorl between the keels is plane and at the sutures slightly angulated. The outer lip is expanded and on its surface radiately ridged. The siphonal canal is twisted, and recurve. The sinus is a very narrow deep slit, terminating in a round hole.

Distribution
This marine species occurs off Kingsmill Island, Polynesia; also off Kiribati; Réunion and the Philippines.

References

 Liu J.Y. [Ruiyu] (ed.)(2008). Checklist of marine biota of China seas. China Science Press. 1267 pp

External links
 Pease W.H. (1863 ["1862"]). Description of new species of marine shells from the Pacific Islands. Proceedings of the Zoological Society of London. (1862): 240–243
 
 Gastropods.com: Eucyclotoma bicarinata

bicarinata
Gastropods described in 1863